An extremely large telescope (ELT) is an astronomical observatory featuring an optical telescope with an aperture for its primary mirror from 20 metres up to 100 metres across,
when discussing reflecting telescopes of optical wavelengths including ultraviolet (UV), visible, and near infrared wavelengths. Among many planned capabilities, extremely large telescopes are planned to increase the chance of finding Earth-like planets around other stars. Telescopes for radio wavelengths can be much bigger physically, such as the  aperture fixed focus radio telescope of the Arecibo Observatory. Freely steerable radio telescopes with diameters up to  have been in operation since the 1970s.

These telescopes have a number of features in common, in particular the use of a segmented primary mirror (similar to the existing Keck telescopes), and the use of high-order adaptive optics systems.

Although extremely large telescope designs are large, they can have smaller apertures than the aperture synthesis on many large optical interferometers. However, they may collect much more light, along with other advantages.

List of telescopes

The Keck Observatory (2 x 10 m) and the Very Large Telescope, of the European Southern Observatory on Cerro Paranal in the Atacama Desert of northern Chile,  measure 4 × 8.2 m and 4 × 1.8 m, all on separate mounts but in one building for interferometry.

Budget
Possible budget figures, which are estimates and can vary over time. For construction costs, it is recommended to estimate the cost of a giant telescope with the following equation:

Projects

There were several telescopes in various stages in the 1990s and early 2000s, and some developed into construction projects.

Under construction
 ELT: Extremely Large Telescope
 GMT: Giant Magellan Telescope

Funded construction
 TMT: Thirty Meter Telescope

Projects
Some of these projects have been cancelled, or merged into ongoing extremely large telescopes.
 GSMT: Giant Segmented Mirror Telescope, merged into TMT
 OWL: Overwhelmingly Large Telescope, passed over in favor of ELT
 VLOT: Very Large Optical Telescope, merged into TMT
 LAT: Large Atacama Telescope
 EURO50: European 50-metre Telescope, merged into ELT
 LPT: Large Petal Telescope
 Magellan 20, merged into GMT
 HDRT:  High Dynamic Range Telescope

 JELT: Japanese ELT Project; Japan joined the TMT project in 2008
 CELT: California Extremely Large Telescope, became/merged into TMT
 MAXAT: Maximum Aperture Telescope

See also
 List of largest optical reflecting telescopes
 List of telescope types

References

External links 
 
 Australian National Workshop on Extremely Large Telescopes (ELTs)
 The OPTICON ELT Working Group a Europe-wide research project
 The science case for Extremely Large Telescopes (ELTs) from the Royal Observatory, Edinburgh
 Colossus Telescope

Optical telescopes